Walid Hamidi (born 16 October 1996 in Oran) is an Algerian footballer who plays for KF Shkupi in the Macedonian First Football League.

On 16 May 2017 Hamidi made his senior debut for MC Oran as a second-half substitute against USM Alger.

Honours 

 Macedonian First League:
Winners (1): 2021–22

References

External links
 

1996 births
Algerian footballers
Living people
MC Oran players
ASM Oran players
JSM Skikda players
Algerian Ligue Professionnelle 1 players
Algerian Ligue 2 players
People from Oran
Association football forwards
21st-century Algerian people